Maccabi Ashdod B.C. is a professional basketball team based in the port city of Ashdod, Israel. The team currently plays in the Israeli National League.

History 
The team was founded in 1961 by "Maccabi Ashdod Sports Association", with the help of former Maccabi Cairo players who migrated to Israel and played for the club in the first years in the Outdoor court. 

The team played in the Second league since 1998/99.
and in the Ligat Ha'al in Israel since 2010/11.

In the 2010/11 Season, the team finished in sixth place, and in the playoff up to quarter-final. In the State Cup, Lost to Maccabi Tel Aviv at the Semi-final.

In the 2011/12 Season, the team reached the finals of the championship of Israel, and Lost to Maccabi Tel Aviv at the final game 63-83.

On October 6, 2012, the team reached the finals of the League Cup, and Lost to Maccabi Tel Aviv 65-75.

Honours
Israeli Championship:
Runners-up (1): 2011-12
Israeli League Cup:
Runners-up (1): 2012-13
Israeli State Cup:
Runners-up (1): 2015-16

Players

Current roster

Depth chart

Notable players

 
 Moran Roth 1 season: '01–'02
 Moti Daniel 1 season: '01–'02
 Joe Dawson 1 season: '03–'04
 Jeron Roberts 1 season: '04–'05
 Ramón Clemente 1 season: '09–'10
 Ramel Bradley 1 season: '10–'11
 Jan Martín 1 season: '10–'11
 Meir Tapiro 2 seasons: '10–'12
 Josh Duncan 2 seasons: '10–'12
 Josh Carter 3 seasons: '10–'12, '18–'19
 Oliver Lafayette 1 season: '11
 Craig Brackins 1 season: '11
 Alex Tyus 1 season: '11–'12
 Kenny Gabriel 1 season: '12–'13
 Diamon Simpson 1 season: '12–'13
 Mardy Collins 1 season: '12–'13
 Kenny Hayes 1 season: '13–'14
 Xavier Silas 1 season: '13–'14
 Elijah Millsap 1 season: '14
 James Nunnally 1 season: '14–'15
 Curtis Kelly 1 season: '14–'15
 Avi Ben-Chimol 1 season: '14–'15
 Ivan Aska 1 season: '14–'15
 Diante Garrett 1 season: '15–'16
 Charles Thomas 1 season: '15–'16
 Isaiah Swann 1 season: '15–'16
 Jonathan Skjöldebrand 1 season: '15–'16
 Jake Cohen 1 season: '16–'17
 Chase Simon 1 season: '16–'17
 Adam Ariel 2 seasons: '16–'18
 Gerald Lee 1 season: '17–'18
 Cameron Long 1 season: '17–'18
 Sek Henry 1 season: '17–'18
 Nimrod Levi 2 seasons: '17–'18, '19
 Lis Shoshi 1 season: '18–'19
 Paul Stoll 2 seasons: '18–20'
 Mark Tollefsen 2 seasons: '18–'19, '20–present

See also
 Maccabi Bnot Ashdod
 Maccabi Ironi Ashdod F.C.

References

Israeli Basketball Premier League teams
Ashdod
Basketball teams established in 1961
Ashdod
Sport in Ashdod
1961 establishments in Israel